Sportsmatch U.K. Ltd. was formerly known as J & J Ford Ltd until 1992 when the name was changed.  The company was formed by John Ford in 1972.  John set up making scope mounts and scope rings but after 16 years the Sportsmatch GC2 air rifle was born.  The rifle was revolutionary at the time as it was a precharged pneumatic air rifle with a fully regulated valve system.  This meant that it was the most accurate air rifle of its day.  In 1991 and 1998 the GC2 won the world field target championship and many other championships across the globe and is still one of the most accurate and dependable regulated pneumatics available in 2017. The GC2 was entirely built by hand at the Leighton Buzzard factory in small numbers.

Production of the GC2 was discontinued in 1995 so that the company could concentrate on production of its increasing range of quality scope mounts which were becoming widely known as some of the best scope mounts and rings in the world.

Orders from various military special forces and police units across the world kept sportsmatch busy producing some special angled one piece scope rings.  This led to the development of adjustable models which mean shooters can almost zero their rifle in without using the telescopic sights adjustment.

In 2012 Sportsmatch celebrated its 40th Birthday.    Since its beginning in 2012 Sportsmatch has become a globally much respected player in the quality scope mount and scope rings market.

During 2013 interest in Sportsmatch scope mounts has continued with new distributors being appointed in Chile, Brazil and Portugal.  Also during the year the company has developed a range of 30mm scope rings for Tikka and CZ centre fire rifles as well as an extended 1 piece mount for AR15 type rifles.  This model has been well received due to its Maxiclamp design.  Field Target shooting is the pinnacle of air rifle competition and during the year Sportsmatch sponsored shooters Andy Calpin and Connor McFlynn have performed well.  Andy has won the BFTA Grand Prix Series, The BFTA British Championships and the BFTA Showdown final.  Connor topped the score sheets after day 1 of the World Field Target Championships in Ebern Germany and managed a 6th place overall after day 3.

During 2014 Sportsmatch sponsored shooter Andy Calpin once again dominated the British Field Target Championships winning several events and showing fantastic consistency.  During 2014 Sportsmatch also appointed distributors in Slovakia and Slovenia as well as seeing increasing demand from France.

Sportsmatch founder John Ford died on 7 January 2015, after suffering a short illness. Ford had retired from the scope mount business and lived in southern Spain.

During 2016 Sportsmatch have continued to add models to their weaver / picatinny range with new models of scope mount in development for CZ and Tikka rifles.

References

External links 
 http://www.sportsmatch-uk.com

Manufacturing companies of the United Kingdom